This is an incomplete list of notable natives and residents of the Las Vegas metropolitan area, which includes Las Vegas, Nevada. Natives are individuals born in the Las Vegas metropolitan area. Non-natives are people who play or played a notable role in the history of Las Vegas or the Las Vegas metropolitan area while residing in the city.

See also

References

 
People
Las Vegas
Las Vegas